Kostomarovo is a rural locality (a selo) in Yudinskoye Rural Settlement, Podgorensky District, Voronezh Oblast, Russia. In the 19th century the village was part of Sagunovskaya volost, Ostrogozhsky Uyezd, Voronezh Governorate. The population was 263 as of 2010. There are 4 streets.

Geography 
Kostomarovo is located on the Central Russian Upland, 40 km north of Podgorensky (the district's administrative centre) by road. Pokrovka is the nearest rural locality.

References 

Rural localities in Podgorensky District
Ostrogozhsky Uyezd